Schallanalyse (pronounced ), "sound analysis,") was a method of poetic analysis developed by the renowned philologist Eduard Sievers, and described in detail in his book Ziele und Wege der Schallanalyse (1924). Sievers had previously developed a system of "five types" to describe the rhythmic patterns found in Old English and Old Saxon poetry, which had met with widespread acceptance. He then abandoned the five types in favor of his new model. Schallanalyse, however, proved difficult to understand for even the most intelligent people in his field and had very few adherents, usually people who worked with Sievers personally.

Philology